WPVH (90.7 FM) was a radio station airing a Christian format licensed to serve Plymouth, New Hampshire.  The station was owned by Wentworth Baptist Church and was an affiliate of the Fundamental Broadcasting Network.

The station's license was surrendered to the Federal Communications Commission on December 17, 2013, at which point it was cancelled.

References

External links

PVH
Plymouth, New Hampshire
Radio stations established in 2010
2010 establishments in New Hampshire
Radio stations disestablished in 2013
2013 disestablishments in New Hampshire
Defunct radio stations in the United States
Defunct religious radio stations in the United States
PVH